Joseph Platt may refer to:

Joseph Platt (politician) (1672–1748), American politician
Joseph Platt (university president) (1915–2012), American physicist and academic administrator